Prusice is a town in Trzebnica County, Lower Silesian Voivodeship (SW Poland).

Prusice may also refer to:

Prusice, Złotoryja County, a village in Złotoryja County, Lower Silesian Voivodeship
Gmina Prusice
Prusice (Prague-East District)